An exposure suit, or anti-exposure suit is clothing intended to protect the wearer from an extreme environment. Depending on the environment and specific use the suit may be required to provide thermal insulation, buoyancy, and or complete isolation from the environment. The exposure suit may be a stand-alone unit, or may require undergarments to function correctly. The choice of undergarments may depend on the specific environment. A common use of the term refers to protection from cold and wet environments at sea. Depending on type, they may be worn during normal work, in emergencies, or when exposed to unusual conditions.

Examples of exposure suits as a class include diving suits, space suits, offshore survival suits, immersion suits, and foul weather gear. Snowsuits, firefighting apparel, hazmat suits and other body-covering personal protective equipment may also be considered forms of exposure suit.

Types

SOLAS offshore anti-exposure suit.

Diving suits

Foul weather gear

References

Occupational safety and health
Clothing